Night Beat is a 1931 American pre-Code crime film directed by George B. Seitz.

Cast
 Jack Mulhall as Johnny
 Patsy Ruth Miller as Eleanor
 Walter McGrail as Martin
 Harry Cording as Chill Scarpelli
 Ernie Adams as Weissenkorn
 Richard Cramer as Featherstone
 Harry Semels as Italian

References

Bibliography
 Pitts, Michael R. Poverty Row Studios, 1929–1940: An Illustrated History of 55 Independent Film Companies, with a Filmography for Each. McFarland & Company, 2005.

External links
 
 
 
 Night Beat available for free download from Internet Archive

1931 films
1931 crime films
American crime films
American black-and-white films
Films directed by George B. Seitz
Mayfair Pictures films
1930s English-language films
1930s American films